The Pavillion Hotel on Main St. Square in Taylor, Nebraska is a historic building that was listed on the National Register of Historic Places in 1989.

It was built by Herman Carter in 1887 in anticipation of arrival of the railroad, which was just 13 miles east in Burwell, Nebraska.  However, the railroad never came.

The site has also been designated NEHBS #LP03-1.

References

External links 

Hotel buildings on the National Register of Historic Places in Nebraska
Second Empire architecture in Nebraska
Buildings and structures in Loup County, Nebraska
National Register of Historic Places in Loup County, Nebraska